Several individuals named Bacon have served as United States state or federal representatives, including:

Augustus Octavius Bacon (1839-1914), Georgia state Representative (1871–1886)
Cyrus Bacon, Michigan state representative (1849)
Daniel S. Bacon, Michigan state representative (1839)
Don Bacon (1963-),  U.S. Representative for Nebraska's 2nd congressional district (2017-)
John Bacon (Massachusetts politician) (1738-1820), state Representative (1801-1803)
Kevin Bacon (politician) (1971-), Ohio state Representative (2007–2010)
Robert Bacon (Iowa politician) (1959-), state Representative (2013-)
Robert L. Bacon (1884-1938), U.S. Representative from New York's 1st district (1923-1938)

See also
Bacon (name)